William Jackson (April 18, 1858 – May 31, 1938) was a Canadian politician.

Born in Port Stanley, Canada West, Jackson was educated at the High School of St. Thomas and the Ontario Business College in 
Belleville, Ontario. A farmer by occupation, he was elected to the House of Commons of Canada for the riding of Elgin West in the general elections of 1904. A Conservative, he did not run in 1908.

He was County Councillor for District No. 3, County of Elgin for eight years and Warden of the County in 1902.

References
 
 The Canadian Parliament; biographical sketches and photo-engravures of the senators and members of the House of Commons of Canada. Being the tenth Parliament, elected November 3, 1904

1858 births
1938 deaths
Conservative Party of Canada (1867–1942) MPs
Members of the House of Commons of Canada from Ontario